The Mystery of Mr. Bernard Brown is an 1896 novel by the British writer E. Phillips Oppenheim. Following the apparent murder of a man, a novelist comes under suspicion.

Film adaptation
In 1921 the novel was turned in a film The Mystery of Mr. Bernard Brown directed by Sinclair Hill. It was made by Stoll Pictures, the largest British studio of the era.

References

Bibliography
 Low, Rachael. History of the British Film, 1918-1929. George Allen & Unwin, 1971.

External links
 

1896 British novels
Novels set in England
Novels by E. Phillips Oppenheim
British novels adapted into films